Pseudoeurycea juarezi is a species of salamander in the family Plethodontidae, endemic to Mexico.

Its natural habitat is subtropical or tropical moist lowland forests.  It is threatened by habitat loss.

Phylogenetically, the species that are more closely related to P. juarezi are, in order of phylogenetic distance, P. saltator, P. aurantia, P. ruficauda, and P. jaguar.

References

juarezi
Endemic amphibians of Mexico
Fauna of the Sierra Madre de Oaxaca
Taxonomy articles created by Polbot
Amphibians described in 1966